Anthony Eric Martins (born November 19, 1972) is an American professional baseball coach for the Oakland Athletics of Major League Baseball (MLB).

Career
Martins attended La Serna High School in Whittier, California. He attended Cerritos College and Long Beach State. Martins was drafted by the Oakland Athletics in the 17th round of the 1994 MLB draft.

Martins played in the Athletics organization as an infielder from 1994 through the 2000 season, reaching the Triple-A level. He spent the 2001 through 2003 seasons in independent baseball. In 2004, he played his final season with the Nettuno Baseball Club in the Italian Baseball League.

Martins rejoined the Athletics organization in 2007 as a scout and remained in that role through 2014. In 2015, Martins transitioned to coaching and served as the hitting coach for the Midland RockHounds in 2015, Nashville Sounds from 2016 through 2018, and Las Vegas Aviators in 2019.

On October 31, 2019, Martins was promoted to assistant hitting coach of the Athletics.

References

External links

1972 births
Living people
African-American baseball coaches
African-American baseball players
American expatriate baseball players in Canada
Baseball coaches from California
Baseball players from Los Angeles
Baseball infielders
Cerritos Falcons baseball players
Edmonton Trappers players
American expatriate baseball players in Italy
Huntsville Stars players
Long Beach Breakers players
Long Beach State Dirtbags baseball players
Major League Baseball hitting coaches
Minor league baseball coaches
Modesto A's players
Nettuno Baseball Club players
Oakland Athletics coaches
Oakland Athletics scouts
Sacramento River Cats players
Somerset Patriots players
Southern Oregon A's players
Vancouver Canadians players
West Michigan Whitecaps players
21st-century African-American sportspeople
20th-century African-American sportspeople